Fruitvale is a small city in Van Zandt County, Texas, United States. The population was 408 at the 2010 census, and 428 as of 2019. The town draws its name from its location. Missouri Pacific Railroad in the center of the historic fruit-growing district of the Sabine River valley in northeastern Van Zandt County. Its name was originally Bolen Switch, but it was changed around 1901 after a petition of local fruit growers, and a post office was established in 1903. In April 2017, an EF-2 tornado struck the town causing much damage and several injuries. Fruitvale Independent School District serves the town for head start to 12th grade.

Geography

Fruitvale is located at  (32.682930, –95.799609). It lies along U.S. Highway 80 between Edgewood and Grand Saline.

According to the United States Census Bureau, the city has a total area of 1.9 square miles (4.9 km2), all of it land.

Demographics

As of the census of 2000, there were 418 people, 157 households, and 116 families residing in the city. The population density was 218.4 people per square mile (84.5/km2). There were 172 housing units at an average density of 89.9 per square mile (34.8/km2). The racial makeup of the city was 92.82% White, 0.96% African American, 0.96% Native American, 0.24% Asian, 2.87% from other races, and 2.15% from two or more races. Hispanic or Latino of any race were 3.59% of the population.

There were 157 households, out of which 37.6% had children under the age of 18 living with them, 55.4% were married couples living together, 15.9% had a female householder with no husband present, and 25.5% were non-families. 23.6% of all households were made up of individuals, and 13.4% had someone living alone who was 65 years of age or older. The average household size was 2.62 and the average family size was 3.03.

In the city the population was spread out, with 29.4% under the age of 18, 8.4% from 18 to 24, 26.1% from 25 to 44, 20.3% from 45 to 64, and 15.8% who were 65 years of age or older. The median age was 35 years. For every 100 females, there were 92.6 males. For every 100 females age 18 and over, there were 86.7 males.

The median income for a household in the city was $24,625, and the median income for a family was $31,250. Males had a median income of $25,417 versus $25,625 for females. The per capita income for the city was $11,394. About 21.8% of families and 21.6% of the population were below the poverty line, including 30.7% of those under age 18 and 10.8% of those age 65 or over.

Education

The City of Fruitvale is served by the Fruitvale Independent School District. The Fruitvale Independent School District consists of Hallie Randall Elementary (HS–5), Fruitvale Junior High (6–8), and Fruitvale High School (9–12). Fruitvale ISD is a 1A school with a typical graduating class of 25 students.

Law Enforcement
Fruitvale has no police department so they are served by local Van Zandt County Sheriff's deputies. Fruitvale has a volunteer fire department.

Local Business 
Fruitvale is served by several business including Erwin Concrete, Fruitvale Storage, and Means Feed and Grocery, which is the only gas station in the town. Means Grocery is located in the center of the town across from the post office.

Politics 
Fruitvale is heavily Republican like the rest of Van Zandt County and East Texas. Fruitvale has voted for the Republican presidential candidate in all presidential elections since 1984. In 2016, Donald Trump received 85% of the vote in Fruitvale. Fruitvale also consistently votes Republican in state and local elections. Before 1984, Fruitvale was heavily Democratic along with the rest of Van Zandt County.

References

External links
 KWJB RADIO the official website of the only broadcasting station in Van Zandt County
 Van Zandt County News
Fruitvale TX Official Website

Cities in Texas
Cities in Van Zandt County, Texas